Busch may refer to:

People
Busch (surname)

Places
Busch (Ortsteile), a subdivision of the municipality of Odenthal, Germany
Busch, Missouri, a ghost town in the United States
Germán Busch Province, Santa Cruz Department, Bolivia
Puerto Busch, located in Germán Busch Province

Other uses
Anheuser-Busch, brewery
Busch beer, one of Anheuser-Busch's product lines
Busch Campus (Rutgers University)
Busch Gardens, theme park
Busch Series, former Name for NASCAR's Number two series now called the Xfinity Series
Busch Stadium, a stadium in the US city of St. Louis, Missouri; home of the St. Louis Cardinals baseball team
Busch Quartet, a string quartet led by Adolf Busch
, a German fishing vessel in service 1935-39 and 1945–56, served as a vorpostenboot and weather ship during World War II

See also
Bush (surname)
Bausch